Kanstantsin Sivtsov (or Siutsou (Łacinka: Kanstancin Viktaravič Siŭcoŭ; born 9 August 1982) is a Belarusian former professional road bicycle racer, who rode professionally between 2001 and 2018 for the Itera, Lokomotiv,  and  squads. He retired after provisionally being suspended from the sport following an adverse analytical finding for erythropoietin (EPO).

Career
Sivtsov was born in the Belarusian city of Gomel in 1982. He won the under-23 road race at the UCI Road World Championships. Sivtsov joined  for the 2007 season, and rode the Tour de France, finishing 32nd overall.

Team High Road (2008–11)
In the 2009 Giro d'Italia, Sivtsov won his first two Grand Tour stages, the team time trial on stage one and a successful solo breakaway in stage eight.

Sivtsov enjoyed his most successful year in 2011. He finished tenth overall in the Giro d'Italia – again winning the team time trial stage – with an eighth-place finish in the Critérium du Dauphiné, and won the Belarusian National Time Trial Championships for the first time.

Team Sky (2012–15)

He was part of the teams that helped Richie Porte win the Volta ao Algarve, Bradley Wiggins win Paris–Nice, the Tour de Romandie and Critérium du Dauphiné, and Michael Rogers win Bayern–Rundfahrt. Sivtsov was selected to ride the Tour de France as one of Wiggins' main domestiques, but crashed out on stage three with  remaining with a fractured left tibia, the first retirement of the 2012 Tour.

Sivtsov claimed a solo win on stage two of the 2013 Giro del Trentino.

Team Dimension Data (2016)
In October 2015, he announced that he would be leaving Team Sky after four seasons to join  for 2016.

Doping case
On 5 September 2018, the UCI announced that an out of competition test had resulted in an adverse analytical finding of Erythropoietin in a sample collected 31 July 2018. Siutsou was provisionally suspended pending the result of any B sample test. This followed his back injury sustained whilst carrying out a recon of the time trial at the Giro earlier that year.

On 23 June 2020, he was given a four-year ban for doping using EPO.

Major results

2000
 6th Time trial, UCI Junior Road World Championships
2002
 National Road Championships
2nd Time trial
3rd Road race
2003
 2nd  Points race, UEC European Under-23 Track Championships
 National Road Championships
2nd Road race
3rd Time trial
2004
 1st  Road race, UCI Under-23 Road World Championships
 1st  Time trial, National Road Championships
 2nd Overall Volta a Lleida
 4th Ruota d'Oro
2005
 7th Trofeo Melinda
2006
 1st  Road race, National Road Championships
 2nd Subida al Naranco
 3rd Gran Premio Industria e Commercio Artigianato Carnaghese
 4th Overall Course de la Paix
1st Young rider classification
1st Stage 5
 4th Gran Premio Nobili Rubinetterie
 9th Giro di Toscana
 10th Giro dell'Emilia
2007
 2nd Giro dell'Appennino
 3rd Gran Premio Città di Camaiore
 3rd Tre Valli Varesine
 4th Giro del Lazio
 5th Coppa Placci
 8th Gran Premio di Lugano
 8th Gran Premio di Chiasso
 9th Overall Settimana Internazionale di Coppi e Bartali
2008
 1st  Overall Tour de Georgia
1st Stage 6
2009
 Giro d'Italia
1st Stages 1 (TTT) & 8
 9th Overall Tirreno–Adriatico
 10th Overall Tour de Romandie
1st Stage 3 (TTT)
2010
 1st Stage 1 (TTT) Vuelta a España
2011
 National Road Championships
1st  Time trial
2nd Road race
 8th Overall Critérium du Dauphiné
 9th Overall Giro d'Italia
1st Stage 1 (TTT)
2012
 5th Overall Bayern–Rundfahrt
2013
 1st  Time trial, National Road Championships
 Giro del Trentino
1st Stages 1b (TTT) & 2
 1st Stage 2 (TTT) Giro d'Italia
 UCI Road World Championships
3rd  Team time trial
10th Time trial
 8th Overall Route du Sud
2014
 1st  Time trial, National Road Championships
 4th Overall Route du Sud
2015
 6th Overall Settimana Internazionale di Coppi e Bartali
 7th Trofeo Andratx-Mirador d'es Colomer
 8th Overall Vuelta a Andalucía
2016
 National Road Championships
1st  Road race
1st  Time trial
 10th Overall Giro d'Italia
2017
 6th Overall Tour of Croatia
2018
 1st  Overall Tour of Croatia
1st Stage 3
 3rd Time trial, National Road Championships
 9th Overall Vuelta a San Juan

Grand Tour general classification results timeline

References

External links

 Kanstantsin Siutsou profile at Team Sky
 

1982 births
Living people
Sportspeople from Gomel
Belarusian male cyclists
Belarusian Giro d'Italia stage winners
Cyclists at the 2008 Summer Olympics
Cyclists at the 2016 Summer Olympics
Olympic cyclists of Belarus
Belarusian sportspeople in doping cases
Doping cases in cycling